Lodderena formosa is a minute sea snail or micromollusc, a marine gastropod mollusc in the family Skeneidae.

Description
The height of this shell attains 0.75 mm, its diameter 1.4 mm.

Distribution
This marine species is endemic to New Zealand.

References

 Powell A.W.B. (1930) New species of New Zealand Mollusca from shallow-water dredgings. Part 2. Transactions and Proceedings of the Royal Society of New Zealand 61: 536-546. page(s): 541
 Powell A. W. B., New Zealand Mollusca, William Collins Publishers Ltd, Auckland, New Zealand 1979 

formosa
Gastropods of New Zealand
Gastropods described in 1930